Marion Township is a township in Centre County, Pennsylvania, United States. It is part of the State College, Pennsylvania Metropolitan Statistical Area. The population was 1,196 at the 2020 census, a decline from the figure of  1,224 tabulated in 2010. Part of Bald Eagle State Park is in Marion Township.

Geography

Marion Township is bordered by Boggs and Howard townships to the northwest, Liberty Township to the north, Clinton County to the northeast, Walker Township to the southeast and Spring Township to the southwest.

Demographics

As of the census of 2000, there were 978 people, 322 households, and 268 families residing in the township.  The population density was 44.6 people per square mile (17.2/km).  There were 339 housing units at an average density of 15.5/sq mi (6.0/km).  The racial makeup of the township was 99.39% White, 0.10% African American, 0.20% Native American, and 0.31% from two or more races. Hispanic or Latino of any race were 0.20% of the population.

There were 322 households, out of which 46.3% had children under the age of 18 living with them, 75.2% were married couples living together, 5.3% had a female householder with no husband present, and 16.5% were non-families. 13.0% of all households were made up of individuals, and 5.3% had someone living alone who was 65 years of age or older.  The average household size was 3.03 and the average family size was 3.35.

In the township the population was spread out, with 30.8% under the age of 18, 7.2% from 18 to 24, 32.8% from 25 to 44, 20.9% from 45 to 64, and 8.4% who were 65 years of age or older.  The median age was 34 years. For every 100 females, there were 107.6 males.  For every 100 females age 18 and over, there were 105.2 males.

The median income for a household in the township was $41,985, and the median income for a family was $46,691. Males had a median income of $30,417 versus $23,681 for females. The per capita income for the township was $15,153.  About 4.7% of families and 4.3% of the population were below the poverty line, including 1.3% of those under age 18 and 18.2% of those age 65 or over.

References

External links
Marion Township official website

Populated places established in 1785
Townships in Centre County, Pennsylvania
Townships in Pennsylvania